Coming Soon Television was an italian TV channel dedicated to the world of cinematography.

On 26 March 2014, it was replaced by Fine Living.

Audience 
Below, monthly audience issued by AUDITEL

References 

Italian-language television stations
Television channels and stations disestablished in 2014
2014 disestablishments in Italy